Zeynal Zeynalov may refer to:
 Zeynal Zeynalov (footballer)
 Zeynal Zeynalov (politician)